Paride Tumburus (8 March 1939 – 23 October 2015) was an Italian footballer who played as a defender.

Club career
Born in Aquileia, Tumburus played club football for Bologna F.C. 1909 and Vicenza Calcio, before retiring after a season with Rovereto in 1971.

International career
At international level, Tumburus earned four caps for the Italy national football team between 1962 and 1963, and participated in the 1962 FIFA World Cup as well as the 1960 Olympic Games on home soil, in which is country managed a fourth-place finish.

Death
Tumburus died of a heart attack in his home town of Aquileia on 23 October 2015.

Honours

Club
Bologna
Serie A: 1963–64

References

External links
 
 
 

1939 births
2015 deaths
Italian footballers
Italy international footballers
1962 FIFA World Cup players
Footballers at the 1960 Summer Olympics
Olympic footballers of Italy
Bologna F.C. 1909 players
L.R. Vicenza players
Serie A players
Association football defenders